The 2010 IFAGG World Cup series in Aesthetic Group Gymnastics is a series of competitions officially organized and promoted by the International Federation of Aesthetic Group Gymnastics.

Formats

Medal winners

World Cup

Overall medal table

See also
 2010 World Aesthetic Group Gymnastics Championships

References

External links
Official Site

Aesthetic Group Gymnastics World Cup
2010 in gymnastics